Björkstén is a surname. Notable people with the surname include:

af Björkstén, Finnish noble family
Hacke Björksten (1934–2020), Finnish-Swedish jazz bandleader and saxophonist
Waldemar Björkstén (1873–1933), Finnish sailor

Finnish noble families